Isostructural chemical compounds have similar chemical structures. "Isomorphous" when used in the relation to crystal structures is not synonymous: in addition to the same atomic connectivity that characterises isostructural compounds, isomorphous substances crystallise in the same space group and have the same unit cell dimensions. The IUCR definition used by crystallographers is:

Examples include:
I-Gold(I) bromide is isostructural with gold(I) chloride
Borazine is isostructural with benzene
Indium(I) bromide is isostructural with β-thallium(I) iodide and has a distorted rock salt structure.

Many minerals are isostructural when they differ only in the nature of a cation.

Compounds which are isoelectronic usually have similar chemical structures. For example, methane, CH4, and the ammonium ion, NH4+, are isoelectric and are isostructural 
as both have a tetrahedral structure. The C-H and N-H bond lengths are different and crystal structures are completely different because the ammonium ion only occurs in salts.

References 

Crystallography
Molecular geometry